Fratton is a residential and formerly industrial area of Portsmouth in Hampshire, England. Victorian style terraced houses are dominant in the area, typical of most residential areas of Portsmouth. Fratton has many discount shops and "greasy spoon" cafes, as well as the Bridge Centre shopping centre containing an Asda.

History 
The name Fratton was once Froddington, a Saxon name which originally meant "Frodda's Farm" or "Frodda's village". A pub on Fratton Road is still named "The Froddington Arms".

Goldsmith's Farm and Fratton Common were part of the original small rural village originally called Froddington, the only visible evidence of this being the presence of a public house, "The Froddington Arms" on the western side of Fratton Road. Froddington was one of the three small settlements on Portsea Island mentioned in the Domesday Book. Due to developments during the industrial age, more of the surrounding land was absorbed by Portsmouth in the 1870s and 1880s, principally by new housing developments.

Politics
In the UK Parliament, Fratton is represented as part of the Portsmouth South constituency. Since 2017, Stephen Morgan of the Labour Party has been the member of parliament for Portsmouth South.  
 
In local government, Fratton is a Portsmouth City Council ward. It was formed for the 2002 Portsmouth City Council election as the successor to the pre-2002 Fratton ward.

 indicates seat up for election.

Trivia

 Fratton has been adopted in navy and local slang as a euphemism for the withdrawal method of contraception, "getting off at Fratton", due to Fratton railway station being the last stop before Portsmouth's busiest and largest station - Portsmouth & Southsea railway station.
 Despite its well known name, Portsmouth F.C.'s Fratton Park stadium is not built in the Fratton district of Portsmouth, it was actually built between 1898 and 1899 on farmland around the (then) village of Milton on the eastern side of Portsea Island. The Fratton Park stadium is still within the neighbouring Milton district of Portsmouth, shown by the Portsmouth FC postal code, "PO4 8RA" which has a "PO4" prefix Milton district postal code, not a Fratton (and Portsmouth city centre) "PO1" prefixed code. The streets and houses immediately around Fratton Park are officially designated as being within the "Milton Ward" district for local and national governmental elections. The boundary line between Fratton and Milton is marked along the Portsmouth Direct Line railway line. Fratton Park is located south of the railway line and is therefore within the Milton district.
 Fratton Park's name was deliberately (and misleadingly) chosen in 1899 to persuade users of Fratton railway and tram station that Portsmouth FC's football ground was nearer to convenient transport links than it actually was. Fratton railway station is approximately one mile away from Fratton Park, about a ten-minute walk along Goldsmith Avenue.

References

Areas of Portsmouth